Anne-Marie Gentily (June 12, 1882 - May 24, 1972) was the first French female assessor of a judge and judge at the Children's Court, she was one of the leading figures in Female Masonry postwar years. Anne-Marie Gentily was one of the first nine members of the Supreme Women's Council of France.

References

1972 deaths
1882 births
French women judges